Miguel Janssen (born 5 September 1970 in Oranjestad) is a retired Dutch-Aruban athlete who competed in sprinting events. He represented Aruba at the 1996 Summer Olympics, as well as three outdoor and three indoor World Championships. He later switched allegiance to the Netherlands on 2 August 1998 but did not represent that country at any major competition. Janssen still holds Aruban records on several distances. In addition, he is a former Dutch record holder in the 60 metres indoors and 200 metres outdoors.

His father Harry Janssen was a Dutch middle-distance runner and president of the Aruba Athletic Federation while his mother Ciska Janssen was a Dutch long jumper.

Competition record

Personal bests
Outdoor
100 metres – 10.37 (+0.9 m/s) (Apeldoorn 1999)
200 metres – 20.59 (Assen 1994)
400 metres – 48.31 (Groningen 1995)
Indoor
60 metres – 6.63 (The Hague 1998)
200 metres – 21.14 (Ghent 1998)

References

1970 births
Living people
People from Oranjestad, Aruba
Aruban male sprinters
Dutch male sprinters
Olympic athletes of Aruba
Athletes (track and field) at the 1996 Summer Olympics
World Athletics Championships athletes for Aruba
Aruban people of Dutch descent